These are the international rankings of Kazakhstan.

International rankings

International rankings 2015

International rankings 2016

International rankings 2017

International rankings 2018

International rankings 2019

International rankings 2020

References

Kazakhstan